János Tóth (born 2 March 1955) is a Hungarian former swimmer. He competed in two events at the 1972 Summer Olympics.

References

External links
 

1955 births
Living people
Hungarian male swimmers
Olympic swimmers of Hungary
Swimmers at the 1972 Summer Olympics
People from Heves
Sportspeople from Heves County